Australian Book Review is an Australian arts and literary review. Created in 1961, ABR is an independent non-profit organisation that publishes articles, reviews, commentaries, essays, and new writing. The aims of the magazine are 'to foster high critical standards, to provide an outlet for fine new writing, and to contribute to the preservation of literary values and a full appreciation of Australia's literary heritage'.

History and profile
Australian Book Review was established by Max Harris and Rosemary Wighton as a monthly journal in Adelaide, Australia, in 1961. In 1971 production was reduced to quarterly releases, and lapsed completely in 1974. In 1978 the journal was revived by the National Book Council and, moving to Melbourne, began producing ten issues per year. ABR published the 400th issue of the second series in April 2018. An eleventh issue was added in 2021 (the magazine publishes a double issue in January–February).

ABR is currently in partnership with Monash University and had a previous partnership with Flinders University. The magazine is supported by various organisations including the Australia Council for the Arts, Creative Victoria, Arts SA, and Copyright Agency Limited.

ABR publishes reviews, essays, commentaries, interviews and new creative writing. The magazine is national in readership, authorship, distribution, events and partners. It is available in print and online.

ABR’s diverse programs include three prestigious international prizes, writers’ fellowships worth as much as $10,000, themed issues, national events, cultural tours, and paid editorial internships/cadetships.

Peter Rose is the Editor; and Sarah Holland-Batt is Chairperson of the Board.

Editors
 1961 to 1974 – Geoffrey Dutton, Max Harris and Rosemary Wighton
 1978 to 1986 – John McLaren
 1986 to 1987 – Kerryn Goldsworthy
 1988 – Louise Adler
 1989 to 1995 – Rosemary Sorensen
 1995 to 2000 – Helen Daniel
 2001 to present day – Peter Rose

Calibre Essay Prize 
The Calibre Essay Prize is given annually. The prize, first awarded in 2007, is currently worth a total of A$7,500.

The prize is open to authors around the world writing in English. ABR accepts entries from published authors commentators, and emerging writers. All non-fiction subjects are eligible.

Winners
 2007 – Elisabeth Holdsworth: An die Nachgenborenen: For Those Who Come After
 2008 – Rachel Robertson: Reaching One Thousand and Mark Tredinnick: A Storm and a Teacup
 2009 – Kevin Brophy: "What're yer looking at yer fuckin' dog": Violence and Fear in Žižek's Post-political Neighbourhood and Jane Goodall: Footprints
 2010 – Lorna Hallahan: On being Odd and David Hansen: Seeing Truganini
 2011 – Dean Biron: The Death of the Writer and Moira McKinnon: Who Killed Matilda?
 2012 – Matt Rubinstein: Body and Soul: Copyright and Law Enforcement in the Age of the Electronic Book
 2013 – Martin Thomas: "Because it's your country": Bringing Back the Bones to West Arnhem Land
 2014 – Christine Piper: Unearthing the past
 2015 – Sophie Cunningham: Staying with the trouble
 2016 – Michael Winkler: The Great Red Whale
 2017 – Michael Adams: Salt Blood
 2018 – Lucas Grainger-Brown: We Three Hundred
 2019 – Grace Karskens: Nah Doongh's Song
 2020 – Yves Rees: Reading the Mess Backwards
 2021 – Theodore Ell: Façades of Lebanon

Peter Porter Poetry Prize
Australian Book Review established its annual Poetry Prize in 2005, and in 2011 renamed it the Peter Porter Poetry Prize in memory of the Australian poet Peter Porter (1929–2010). The Prize is one of Australia's most lucrative awards for poetry. Winning and short-listed entries are published in ABR. Judith Bishop and Anthony Lawrence are the only poets to win the prize twice. The prize is open to poets around the world writing in English.

Entrants can submit a single poem of no more than 75 lines. Multiple entries are permitted, and all poems are judged anonymously.

Winners
 2005 – Stephen Edgar: Man on the Moon
 2006 – Judith Bishop: Still Life with Cockles and Shells
 2007 – Alex Skovron:Sanctum
 2008 – Ross Clark:' 'Danger: Lantana
 2009 – Tracy Ryan: Lost Property 2010 – Anthony Lawrence: Domestic Emergencies 2011 – Judith Bishop: 'Openings' and Tony Lintermans: Self-portrait at Sixty 2012 – Michael Farrell: Beautiful Mother 2013 – John A. Scott: Four Sonnets 2014 – Jessica L. Wilkinson: Arrival Platform Humlet 2015 – Judith Beveridge: As Wasps Fly Upwards 2016 – Amanda Joy: Tailings 2017 – Louis Klee: Sentence to Lilacs and Damen O'Brien: pH 2018 – Nicholas Wong: 101, Taipei 2019 – Andy Kissane: Searching the Dead and Belle Ling: 63 Temple Street, Mong Kok 2020 – A. Frances Johnson: My Father's Thesaurus 2021 – Sara M. Saleh: A Poetics of Fo(u)rgetting 2022 – Anthony Lawrence: In the Shadows of Our Heads ABR Elizabeth Jolley Short Story Prize Australian Book Review revived its annual short story competition in 2010, and in 2011 renamed it the ABR Elizabeth Jolley Short Story Prize in memory of the late Australian writer, Elizabeth Jolley (1923–2007). The total prize money is now $12,500. The prize is open to authors around the world writing in English.

Winners
 2010 – Maria Takolander: A Roānkin Philosophy of Poetry 2011 – Carrie Tiffany: Before He Left the Family and Gregory Day: The Neighbour's Beans 2012 – Sue Hurley: Patterns in Nature 2013 – Michelle Michau-Crawford: Leaving Elvis 2014 – Jennifer Down: Aokigahara 2015 – Rob Magnuson Smith: The Elector of Nossnearly 2016 – Josephine Rowe: Glisk 2017 – Eliza Robertson: Pheidippides2018 – Madelaine Lucas: Ruin2019 – Sonja Dechian: The Point-Blank Murder2020 – Mykaela Saunders: River Story2021 – Camilla Chaudhary: The Enemy, Asyndeton ABR Arts 
In 2012, Australian Book Review launched an extension of its coverage of Australian culture, Arts Update, now known as ABR Arts. It presents reviews of film and television, plays, operas, concerts, dance, and art exhibitions.

 Podcasts 
In 2015, Australian Book Review launched two podcasts: Poem of the Week and The ABR Podcast. The ABR Podcast was subsequently revived in 2020.

 Fellowships ABR's Fellowship program began in 2011. Funded by ABR's Patrons and by philanthropic foundations, the Fellowship program is intended to reward Australian writers. Most ABR Fellowships are now worth $10,000. The Fellowship program was originally intended for the creation of a single piece of long-form journalism but since 2018 (starting with Beejay Silcox's ABR Fortieth Birthday Fellowship) Fellows have written and published several long articles over the course of twelve months.

 Fellowships 
 Patrick Allington: "What is Australia, anyway?" The glorious limitations of the Miles Franklin Literary Award Rachel Buchanan: Sweeping Up the Ashes Felicity Plunkett: Sound Bridges: A Profile of Gurrumul Jennifer Lindsay: Man on the Margins Ruth Starke: Media Don: A political enigma in pink shorts Kerryn Goldsworthy: Everyone's a Critic Helen Ennis: Olive Cotton at Spring Forest: The modernist photographer at Spring Forest Arthur Fuhrmann: Patrick White: A theatre of his own Danielle Clode: Seeing the wood for the trees James McNamara: The Golden Age of Television? Shannon Burns: The scientist of his own experience: A Profile of Gerald Murnane Ashley Hay: The forest at the edge of time Michael Aiken: extract from Satan Repentant Alan Atkinson: How Do We Live With Ourselves? The Australian National Conscience Philip Jones: Beyond Songlines Stephen Orr: Ambassadors from Another Time Elisabeth Holdsworth: If This Is A Jew Marguerite Johnson: "Picnic at Hanging Rock" fifty years on Beejay Silcox (ABR Fortieth Birthday Fellow):  We are all MFAs now!, The art of pain: Writing in the age of trauma, and This is the way the world ends Felicity Plunkett: A mutinous and ferocious grace: Nick Cave and trauma's aftermath, review of The Weekend by Charlotte Wood, and a review of Summer by Ali Smith
 Hessom Razavi (ABR Behrouz Boochani Fellowship): Notes on a Pandemic: How society has responded to Covid-19, Failures of imagination: A journey from Tehran's prisons to Australia's immigration detention centres, and The split state: Australia's binary myth about people seeking asylum Rising Stars 
The Rising Stars program was established in 2019. The program is intended to encourage younger writers, enhancing their critical practice and advancing their careers.

 Rising Stars 

 2019 – Alex Tighe and Sarah Walker
 2020 – Declan Fry
 2021 – Mindy Gill and Anders Villani

 ABR Laureates 
Every couple of years ABR names an ABR'' Laureate.

ABR Laureates 

 2014: David Malouf
 2016: Robyn Archer

References

External links 
 Australian Book Review
 The ABR Podcast
 Calibre Essay Prize
 ABR Elizabeth Jolley Short Story Prize
 Peter Porter Poetry Prize

1961 establishments in Australia
Literary magazines published in Australia
Australian literary awards
Monthly magazines published in Australia
Magazines established in 1961
Book review magazines
Mass media in Adelaide